This is a list of male line families (i.e. those families that share a surname) of which at least three members have gained some notability in horse racing in Great Britain.

Arnull

Sam Arnull, jockey; younger brother of
John Arnull, jockey; father of
Bill Arnull, jockey

Balding

Gerald Barnard Balding, Sr., father of
Toby Balding
Ian Balding, father of
Clare Balding
Andrew Balding

Cannon
Tom Cannon, Sr., father of
Kempton Cannon
Mornington Cannon
Tom Cannon, Jr.
Charles Cannon

Carson

Willie Carson, and descendants

Chifney

Samuel Chifney, Sr. (1753-1807), jockey; father of
William Chifney, trainer,
Samuel Chifney, Jr. (b. 1786), jockey

Day
John Day, trainer, father of
John Barham Day (1793-1860), jockey and trainer, father of
Sam Day, Jr. (1818-1838), jockey
John Day, Jr. (1819-1883), jockey and trainer, grandfather of Mornington, Kempton, Tom Jr. and Charles Cannon; great-grandfather of Keith Piggott
William Day (1823-1908), trainer, father of
Alfred Day, founder of Fontwell Racecourse
Alfred Day (1830-1868), jockey
Sam Day (1801-1866), jockey

Goodisson
Dick Goodisson (c. 1750-1817), Oaks-winning jockey; father of
Tom Goodisson (1782-1840), multiple Classic-winning jockey
Charles Goodisson (c. 1786-1813), jockey

Hannon
Harry Hannon, trainer; father of
Richard Hannon Sr. (born 1945), four times British flat racing Champion Trainer; father of
Richard Hannon Jr. (born 1975), trainer

Hastings
Aubrey Hastings, trainer; father of
Peter Hastings-Bass (1920-1964), trainer; grandfather of Andrew Balding and Clare Balding; father of
William Hastings-Bass, 17th Earl of Huntingdon (born 1948), trainer

Hills
Barry Hills, trainer; father of
Michael Hills, jockey
Richard Hills, jockey
Charlie Hills, trainer
John Hills, trainer

Moore
George Moore, trainer; father of
Gary Moore, trainer; father of
Ryan Moore, jockey
Jamie Moore, jockey
Joshua Moore, jockey

Piggott
Ernest Piggott, father of
Keith Piggott, father of 
Lester Piggott

Scudamore
Michael Scudamore, father of
Peter Scudamore, eight time British jump racing Champion Jockey; partner of Lucinda Russell, and father of
Michael Scudamore, Jr., trainer
Tom Scudamore, jockey

Singleton
John Singleton the Elder, (1715-c.1795), first rider to Lord Rockingham between 1760 and 1780; uncle of
John Singleton the Younger, also rider to Lord Rockingham and winner of the first running of the St. Leger Stakes in 1776; father of
John Singleton, Jr., who rode the winner of the 1797 Derby

Templeman
Sim Templeman (1805-1884), winner of seven Classics; uncle of
William Templeman (1858-1914), jockey, father of
Clark Templeman (1885-1953), jockey
Arthur Templeman (1886-1938), jockey, winner of the 1905 Cambridgeshire Handicap
Fred Templeman (1892-1973), jockey, winner of the 1919 Derby

Tinkler
Colin Tinkler Sr (1927-2016), trainer, father of
Colin Tinkler Jr (b 1954), jockey and trainer, father of
Andrew Tinkler (b 1985), jockey
Nicky Tinkler, amateur jockey
Nigel Tinkler (b 1958), jockey and trainer

Wragg
Harry Wragg (1902-1985), Classic winner as jockey and trainer, brother of
Sam Wragg (1909-1983), Classic winning jockey, brother of
Arthur Wragg (1912-1954)

Horse racing in Great Britain
Horse racing-related lists
United Kingdom sport-related lists